"Bayini" is 'spiritual love song' performed in Yolngu Matha, an indigenous language of Northern Australia. It is track three on Geoffrey Gurrumul Yunupingu's album, Rrakala, which was released by Skinny Fish Music on April 15, 2011.

Meaning
According to the National Museum of Australia, "Bayini" are light-skinned mythological beings who were also involved in collecting and curing trepang (an edible sea cucumber). In literature, the first non-Aboriginal visitors to the Arnhem Land coast are referred to as Bayini. In songs that record and preserve their traditions, Aboriginal people of Arnhem land tell of the Bayini gypsies with copper coloured skin who visited their shores.

John Gratorex said in the Rrakala sleeve notes; "Yolngu are deep thinking philosophical people. The words in the song refer to many families sitting together on the beach looking to waves and sea, the horizon, contemplating. Long ago from over the horizon the Bayini came to Yolngu country."

Gurrumul and Sarah Blasko version

On June 1, 2012, "Bayini" was re-recorded for radio release. The main version contained vocals from singer, Sarah Blasko, singing additional lyrics in English.

In July 2012, the song received unprecedented attention and began getting airplay on ABC radio and Triple J and Gurrumul's album, Rrakala, achieved platinum sales in Australia.

Gurrumul and Delta Goodrem version

In 2013, Gurrumul joined Delta Goodrem and the Sydney Symphony Orchestra for a special performance of Bayini on The Voice Australia. The clip has had over 1,746,395 views on YouTube.
Goodrem said of the performance; "Gurrumul is one of this country's greatest voices and to receive his invitation to perform on 'The Voice' was so special and something I will cherish forever." The performance was in celebration of National Reconciliation Week and following popular demand, the single was released on May 31 with proceeds of the single going towards the newly formed Gurrumul Yunupingu Foundation, which aims to help young people in indigenous communities realise their potential.

Despite peaking at number #1 on iTunes throughout the week, "Bayini" debuted at #4 on the ARIA singles chart, thus becoming Gurrumul's highest-charting single and Goodrem's 13th top 5 single.

Chart performance

Weekly chart

Yearly chart

References

External links

2012 singles
2013 singles
2011 songs
Delta Goodrem songs